Abralia is a genus of squid comprising around 20 species from the family Enoploteuthidae. They are small squid which can be found in the epipelagic to mesopelagic zones while some species are found in water with shallow substrates on steep slopes on the boundary of the mesopelagic zone. They are distinguished from other members of the Enoploteuthidae by not normally having large, black photophores at the tips of arms IV, although if these are present they are not covered in black chromatophores, and having fins which extend beyond their tail. The photophores of the integument are characteristicand are found in the three types . "Lensed" photophores are a blue color with a white ring, "simple" photophores are small and violet-colored and the "complex" photophores are surrounded by small green satellite points and have a green centre. The complex photophores will frequently appear to be blue depending on their physiological state. The integument also has small black chromatophores which look like dots. They have 5-12 variably sized photophores on the eye. Either the right or left arm IV is hectocotylized.

Abralia is the most speciose genus in the Enoploteuthidae and is normally divided in to six subgenera, however, recent studies suggest that these may not form natural groupings. They have worldwide distribution in tropical and subtropical seas. They spend the day at depths below 600m and at night they move to less than 200m in depth. These quid are important prey species for large fish such as tuna and billfish as well as toothed whales.

Species
The following species are currently recognised and are divided into six subgenera:

Subgenus Abralia Gray, 1849
Abralia armata (Quoy & Gaimard, 1832)
Abralia multihamata Sasaki, 1929
Abralia renschi  Grimpe, 1931
Abralia spaercki Grimpe, 1931
Abralia steindachneri Weindl, 1912
Subgenus Asteroteuthis Pfeffer, 1908
Abralia veranyi Rüppell, 1844, eye-flash squid or Verany's enope squid
Subgenus Astrabralia Nesis, 1987
Abralia astrolineata Berry, 1914
Abralia astrosticta Berry, 1909
Subgenus Enigmoteuthis Adam, 1973
Abralia dubia Adam, 1960
Abralia fasciolata Tsuchiya, 1991
Abralia marisarabica Okutani, 1983
Subgenus Heterabralia Tsuchiya & Okutani, 1988
Abralia andamanica Goodrich, 1896
Abralia heminuchalis Burgess, 1992
Abralia robsoni Grimpe, 1931
Abralia siedleckyi Lipinski, 1983
Abralia trigonura Berry, 1913
Subgenus Pygmabralia Nesis, 1987
Abralia grimpei Voss, 1959
Abralia omiae Hidaka & Kubodera, 2000
Abralia redfieldi Voss, 1955
Abralia similis Okutani & Tsuchiya, 1987

References

External links

 
Cephalopod genera
Bioluminescent molluscs
Taxa named by John Edward Gray